Francis H. Morrison House is a historic home located at LaPorte, LaPorte County, Indiana.  It was built in 1904, and is a -story, frame dwelling in an eclectic combination of popular revival styles including Tudor Revival, Gothic Revival, Classical Revival, and American Craftsman.  It has a hipped roof with dormers, a two-story sleeping porch, Palladian window, and stuccoed areas with curved corner pieces.

It was listed on the National Register of Historic Places in 1984. It is located in the Indiana and Michigan Avenues Historic District.

References

Houses on the National Register of Historic Places in Indiana
Houses completed in 1904
Houses in LaPorte County, Indiana
National Register of Historic Places in LaPorte County, Indiana
Historic district contributing properties in Indiana
1904 establishments in Indiana